The Topeka Performing Arts Center is a 2,425-capacity performing arts center located in Topeka, Kansas. Opened in 1939, it was built in the Art Deco style and was renovated in 1991, and reopened that same year officially named the Topeka Performing Arts Center. It has hosted notable entertainers, such as Bob Dylan, Johnny Cash, The Beach Boys, Ann & Nancy Wilson, Willie Nelson, Olivia Newton-John and Merle Haggard.

References

External links
 Official website

Performing arts centers in Kansas
Concert halls